Thomas Ohman (1926 – November or December 2016) was an Australian sprint canoer who competed in the late 1950s. At the 1956 Summer Olympics in Melbourne, he finished fifth in the C-2 1000 m and  seventh in the C-2 10000 m event.

References
Thomas Ohman's profile at Sports Reference.com
Thomas Ohman's obituary

1926 births
2016 deaths
Australian male canoeists
Canoeists at the 1956 Summer Olympics
Olympic canoeists of Australia
20th-century Australian people